Lincoln Browder, (born October 12, 1964) better known by his stage name Link, is an American R&B singer from Dallas, Texas.

Career

Browder sang in gospel choirs as a youngster and in a group in high school. Darrell Delite Allamby recruited him to sing in the R&B group Protege.

After writing the hit "My Body" for the R&B supergroup LSG, Link was offered his own recording contract with Relativity Records. His 1998 debut album, Sex Down, spawned one Top 40 hit single in the US, "Whatcha Gonna Do?" (#23 Billboard Hot 100, #15 US Billboard R&B). The track peaked at #48 in the UK Singles Chart in November 1998.  In addition a second charting single was issued, "I Don't Wanna See," which reached #43 on the US R&B chart and #25 on the Hot Singles Sales chart.

Link also wrote songs for Silk, Tony Thompson, Tamar Braxton, K-Ci & JoJo and Gerald Levert.

In 2008, he released his second album Creepin independently. Additionally, a digital single "Erotic" was released in 2013.

Discography

Albums

Singles

References

External links
 Official Twitter

Living people
American male singers
American contemporary R&B singers
Singers from Texas
Songwriters from Texas
1964 births
American male songwriters